The Scottish Women's Football League First Division (SWFL 1) was a division in the Scottish women's football pyramid between 1999 and 2019. The second league tier from 1999 to 2015, it was later the third tier from 2016 to 2019. 

For most of its history, the First Division was a national league whose top teams won promotion to the Scottish Women's Premier League (SWPL), while the lowest were relegated to the Second Division (SWFL 2). Those divisions operated on the traditional autumn–spring football season calendar until 2009, when they switched to a March–November schedule.

From 2016 to 2019, SWFL 1 was split into North and South regional divisions, with one team from each division promoted to SWPL 2. In the 2020 season, SWFL 1 was replaced as the third tier by the Scottish Women's Football Championship.

History

Champions
1999-00: Queen of the South OR Elgin City (both won promotion)
2000–01: Raith Rovers
2001–02: Inver-Ross
2002–03: East Kilbride
2003-04: Aberdeen
2004-05: Forfar Farmington
2005-06: Lochee United
2006–07: Queen's Park
 2008-09: Rangers W.F.C.
2009: Celtic Reserves
2010: Celtic Reserves
2011: Aberdeen
2012: Hibernian Reserves
2013: Queen's Park
2014: Falkirk Ladies
2015: Glasgow Girls F.C. Seniors

Seasons

1999–2009
Queen of the South and Elgin City both won promotion to the Premier Division in 1999-00.
Raith Rovers won the 2000–01 First Division with 44 points, four ahead of Clyde and Shettleston. The member clubs in 2000–01 were:

Aberdeen
Albion Rovers
Clyde
Dundee United

East Kilbride
Forfar Farmington
Hamilton

Raith Rovers
Shettleston
St Johnstone

Promoted in 2001–02 were F.C. Hamilton and the champions Inver-Ross L.F.C., who became Ross County L.F.C. in 2003.

East Kilbride won the First Division and promotion in 2002–03, and reached that season's League Cup final.

Aberdeen, Forfar Farmington and Lochee United were the subsequent champions in 2003-04, 2004-05 and 2005-06 respectively.

Queen's Park were the 2006–07 First Division champions and returned to the SWPL (after the club's previous promotion in 2004 and relegation in 2006).

In 2007–08, the promotion-winners were Dundee United S.C. and Dalkeith Ladies (Boroughmuir Thistle), coached by Pauline MacDonald. The First Division clubs in 2007–08 were:

Bishopbriggs Ladies
Bo'ness United
Buchan
Cowdenbeath Women's

Dundee United
Dalkeith Ladies
Dumfries
Falkirk

Hutchison Vale
Inverness Ladies
Murieston United
Paisley City Ladies

Paisley City Ladies became Rangers W.F.C. in 2008–09, and won promotion to the SWPL that season in a ten-team division:

Bo'ness United
Celtic 'B'
Cowdenbeath
Dumfries

Falkirk
Glasgow Ladies A
Hutchison Vale

Inverness Ladies
Rangers
Tynecastle

2009–2015
The First Division winners in the 2010 season were a team ineligible for promotion, Celtic Reserves, so Hutchison Vale and Falkirk LFC were promoted from the SWFL to the SWPL (replaced by the relegated Aberdeen LFC). Hearts LFC, Buchan and Airdrie United were relegated to the SWFL Second Division and were replaced by Scottish Women's Football League Second Division East champions, Hibernian 2000, and two clubs from the Scottish Women's Football League Second Division West, Paisley Saints Ladies and Wishaw Juniors (formerly Motherwell).

Member clubs in the 2011 season:

 Aberdeen
 Celtic Reserves
 Cowdenbeath
 Glasgow City Reserves
 Hibernian 2000
 Paisley Saints Ladies

 Queen's Park
 Raith Rovers
 Toryglen
 Troon
 Wishaw Juniors 

Aberdeen were the 2011 champions and were promoted to the SWPL. Runners-up Celtic Reserves were ineligible for promotion while third placed Toryglen Ladies folded over the close season. Wishaw Juniors had also folded mid-season and withdrawn from the league. To maintain numbers, no sides were relegated from either the Premier League or the First Division in 2011.

Buchan Ladies, Kilwinning Sports Club, Airdrie United and Forfar Farmington Reserves were promoted from the regional Second Divisions in 2011.

In 2012, the champions and runners up, Hibernian Reserves and Celtic Reserves, were ineligible for promotion to the SWPL. Third-placed Buchan L.F.C. and 4th-placed Kilwinning SC were subsequently promoted, while the relegated Kilmarnock and Inverness City replaced them in SWFL 1. Dunfermline Athletic, East Fife, Hearts and Murieston United were promoted from the regional Second Divisions. Hibernian Reserves withdrew to compete in a newly-formed Development League with the relegated reserve teams of Glasgow City and Forfar Farmington and the Second-Division reserve teams of Spartans and Hamilton Academical.

Airdrie United Ladies played in the 2012 First Division, but were replaced by Cumbernauld Colts in 2013 when the entire Airdrie squad defected to that club.

Troon Ladies merged with Glasgow Girls and assume the latter name.

Member clubs in the 2013 season were:

Celtic Reserves
Cowdenbeath
Cumbernauld Colts
Dunfermline Athletic
East Fife
FC Kilmarnock

Glasgow Girls
Hearts
Inverness City
Murieston United
Paisley Saints Ladies
Queen's Park

The next champions of the First Division were Queen's Park (2013) and Falkirk Ladies (2014).

At the end of 2015, its last season as a national league, the First Division had its top four clubs join SWPL 2 (but they remained level 2 league clubs). The 2015 standings were:

1st: Glasgow Girls F.C. Seniors
2nd: Buchan Ladies
3rd: Jeanfield Swifts
4th: Queen's Park
5th: Cumbernauld Colts
6th: Hibernian Development

7th: Celtic Academy
8th: Mill United
9th: East Fife
10th: Dunfermline Athletic
11th: Boroughmuir Thistle
12th: Murieston United

2016

In the first season after league reconstruction, East Fife won the northern division by 17 points, and Motherwell were SWFL 1 South winners by five points; both were promoted to SWPL 2.

Final standings:

North group:
1st: East Fife
2nd: Dunfermline Athletic
3rd: Central Girls
4th: Aberdeen B
5th: Forfar Farmington B

South group: 
1st: Motherwell
2nd: Hibernian B
3rd: Celtic B
4th: Rangers B
5th: Kilmarnock

2017

Central Girls Football Academy won the North division by 9 points and Kilmarnock won the South division by 20 points. Central had a goal difference of +84 and Kilmarnock +52. Both were promoted to the SWPL 2 for the 2018 season.

Final standings:

North group:
1st: Central Girls
2nd: Dundee United
3rd: Dunfermline Athletic
4th: Granite City
5th: Inverness Caledonian Thistle

South group: 
1st: Kilmarnock
2nd: Celtic B
3rd: Partick Thistle
4th: Renfrew
5th: Cumbernauld Colts

2018
Member clubs in the 2018 season:

North:
Aberdeen 23s
Buchan
Cove Rangers
Dee Ladies
Deveronvale
Dundee United
Dunfermline Athletic
East Fife
Raith Rovers Ladies
Inverness City Ladies
Stirling University Development
Westdyke Ladies

South:
Blackburn United
Boroughmuir Thistle F.C.
Celtic Academy
Cumbernauld Colts
Falkirk
Hibernian Development
Morton
Queen's Park
Rangers Development
Renfrew
Thistle Weir
Westerlands

Final standings:

North group:
1st: Dundee United
2nd: East Fife
3rd: Inverness Caledonian Thistle
4th: Dunfermline Athletic
5th: Cove Rangers

South group: 
1st: Hibernian B
2nd: Celtic B
3rd: Partick Thistle
4th: Queen's Park
5th: Westerlands

2019
Member clubs in the 2019 season:

North:
Aberdeen FC Women
Buchan L.F.C.
Cove Rangers
Deveronvale Ladies
Dunfermline Athletic
East Fife
Inverness Caledonian Thistle FC
Kelty Hearts
 Montrose
Raith Rovers Women
Stonehaven Ladies F.C.
Westdyke Ladies

Details: 

South:
Ayr United	
Blackburn United
Boroughmuir Thistle FC
Celtic Academy
FC Kilmarnock 23s
Glasgow City Development
Hamilton Academical 23s
Hibernian 23s
Queens Park L.F.C.
Rangers Development
Renfrew Ladies FC
Spartans Development

Details: 

Final standings:

North group:
1st: Aberdeen
2nd: Inverness Caledonian Thistle
3rd: Cove Rangers
4th: Buchan
5th: Dunfermline Athletic

South group: 
1st: Glasgow City Development
2nd: Celtic Academy
3rd: Hibernian 23s
4th: Queen's Park
5th: Boroughmuir Thistle

See also
Scottish Women's Football League First Division Cup
Scottish Women's Football Championship

References

External links
League at Scottish Womens Football
League at women.soccerway.com
League tables and memberships 1972-date at the Scottish Football Historical Archive

2
1999 establishments in Scotland
2019 disestablishments in Scotland
Sports leagues established in 1999
Sports leagues disestablished in 2019
Defunct football leagues in Scotland